Christian Giménez or Christian Gimenez may refer to:

Christian Giménez (footballer, born 1974), Argentine football striker from Buenos Aires
Christian Giménez (footballer, born 1981), Argentine-Mexican football midfielder from Resistencia, Chaco
Christian Giménez (footballer, born 1994), Paraguayan football striker from Buenos Aires